Ferrimonas kyonanensis is a facultatively anaerobic and mesophilic bacterium from the genus of Ferrimonas which has been isolated from the alimentary tract of a littleneck clam from the Tokyo Bay in Japan.

References

Bacteria described in 2006
Alteromonadales